Camedo railway station is a railway station in the lower part of the village of Camedo, Switzerland. It is located on the  Domodossola–Locarno line of the Regional Bus and Rail Company of Ticino (FART).

On the basis of article 6 of the Convention between Switzerland and Italy concerning a narrow gauge electric railway from Locarno to Domodossola of 12 November 1918 the station is responsible for carrying out customs operations for what concerns the transport of goods and livestock. In order to allow the carrying out of checks (of persons) during the journey, a room inside the station must also be made available to the Italian authorities, in accordance with Article 2 paragraph 7 of the Agreement between Switzerland and Italy relating to the control of trains during the journey on the Ponte Ribellasca-Camedo section of 15 December 1975.

References

External links 
 
 

Railway stations in Ticino
Regional Bus and Rail Company of Ticino stations